

Landspout is a term created by atmospheric scientist Howard B. Bluestein in 1985 for a tornado not associated with a mesocyclone. The Glossary of Meteorology defines a landspout as 
 "Colloquial expression describing tornadoes occurring with a parent cloud in its growth stage and with its vorticity originating in the boundary layer.
 The parent cloud does not contain a preexisting mid-level mesocyclone. The landspout was so named because it looks like "a weak Florida Keys waterspout over land."
Landspouts are typically weaker than mesocyclone-associated tornadoes spawned within supercell thunderstorms, in which the strongest tornadoes form.

Characteristics
Landspouts are a type of tornado that forms during the growth stage of a cumulus congestus or occasionally a cumulonimbus cloud when an updraft stretches boundary layer vorticity upward into a vertical axis and tightens it into a strong vortex. These generally are smaller and weaker than supercell tornadoes and do not form from a mesocyclone or pre-existing rotation in the cloud. Because of this lower depth, smaller size, and weaker intensity, landspouts are rarely detected by Doppler weather radar (NWS).

Landspouts share a strong resemblance and development process to that of waterspouts, usually taking the form of a translucent and highly laminar helical tube. "They are typically narrow, rope-like condensation funnels that form while the thunderstorm cloud is still growing and there is no rotating updraft", according to the National Weather Service. Landspouts are considered tornadoes since a rapidly rotating column of air is in contact with both the surface and a cumuliform cloud. Not all landspouts are visible, and many are first sighted as debris swirling at the surface before eventually filling in with condensation and dust.

Orography can influence landspout (and even mesocyclone tornado) formation. A notable example is the propensity for landspout occurrence in the Denver Convergence Vorticity Zone (DCVZ).

Life cycle 
Forming in relation to misocyclones and under updrafts, a landspout generally lasts for less than 15 minutes; however, they can persist substantially longer, and produce significant damage. Landspouts tend to progress through recognizable stages of formation, maturation, and dissipation, and usually decay when a downdraft or significant precipitation (outflow) occur nearby. They may form in lines or groups of multiple landspouts.

Damage 
Landspouts are commonly weak; however, on rare occasions, a landspout can be as strong as an EF2 or EF3 tornado.

See also
 Dust devil
 Fire whirl
 Funnel cloud
 Tornadogenesis
 Vortex engine
 Whirlwind

References

External links 
 
 Advanced Spotters' Field Guide
 Online Tornado FAQ

Severe weather and convection
Tornado
Vortices

fr:Tornade#Trombes terrestres